The International Film Music Critics Association Award for Best Original Score for Television is an annual award given by the International Film Music Critics Association (IFMCA). Established in 2004, the award is given to the composer of a television score based on two criteria: "the effectiveness, appropriateness and emotional impact of the score in the context of the film for which it was written; and the technical and intellectual merit of the composition when heard as a standalone listening experience."  The awarding period runs January 1 through December 31 every year, and IFMCA members vote for the winner the following February.

, 57 composers have been nominated for the International Film Music Critics Association Award for Best Original Score for Television. The first award was given to Steve Bartek and Danny Elfman for their work on the television series Desperate Housewives.  The most recent recipients was Bear McCreary for his work on the series Masters of the Universe: Revelation. McCreary has also been nominated thirteen times and won three.  Three composers have been nominated multiple times in a year: Ramin Djawadi, Robert Lane, and Bear McCleary.



Winners and nominations
In the tables below, winners are marked by a light green background and a double-dagger symbol.

2000s

2010s

2020s

References

International Film Music Critics Association Awards